is a Japanese vocalist. She was born in the Kanagawa Prefecture, Japan on November 16. She started singing from the age of two under her mother's lead. She also studied modern ballet. She is a graduate of the Musashino Academia Musicae (武蔵野音楽大学 Musasiho Ongaku Daigaku) Her voice has been heard in 'Sona Mi Areru Ec Sancitu' of Panzer Dragoon Saga, 'Anu Orta Veniya' of Panzer Dragoon Orta, and several tracks in Tsubasa Chronicle Future Soundscape I – IV as a collaboration with Yuki Kajiura. Her most recent performances are Godsibb and Hepatica ~KOS-MOS~ for Xenosaga Episode III: Also sprach Zarathustra. She also performed the voice of Belle for the Japanese dubbing of the movie Beauty and the Beast, a role she reprised in Kingdom Hearts II as well as the singing voice of the title character in the Disney movie Mulan. She sang in the premiere performance of the Toho musical "Miss Saigon" as the lead female character Kim.

References

External links 
 
 
 

Living people
Year of birth missing (living people)